Garland is a town in Tipton County, Tennessee. The population was 310 at the 2010 census.

Geography
Garland is located at  (35.577189, -89.755768).

Demographics

As of the census of 2000, there were 309 people, 120 households, and 95 families residing in the town. The racial makeup of the town was 98.06% White, 0.32% African American, 1.29% Native American, and 0.32% from two or more races.

There were 120 households, out of which 32.5% had children under the age of 18 living with them, 60.8% were married couples living together, 15.8% had a female householder with no husband present, and 20.8% were non-families. 20.0% of all households were made up of individuals, and 10.0% had someone living alone who was 65 years of age or older. The average household size was 2.58 and the average family size was 2.94.

In the town, the population was spread out, with 24.9% under the age of 18, 8.7% from 18 to 24, 29.1% from 25 to 44, 21.0% from 45 to 64, and 16.2% who were 65 years of age or older. The median age was 37 years. For every 100 females, there were 100.6 males. For every 100 females age 18 and over, there were 91.7 males.

The median income for a household in the town was $47,083, and the median income for a family was $49,063. Males had a median income of $32,917 versus $23,173 for females. The per capita income for the town was $17,069. About 5.4% of families and 9.4% of the population were below the poverty line, including 6.7% of those under the age of eighteen and 17.9% of those 65 or over.

History 
The village of Garland was named in honor of Dr. John Crawley Garland (1832-1884), a physician who practiced in there.

References

Towns in Tipton County, Tennessee
Towns in Tennessee
Memphis metropolitan area